Oligopetes is an extinct genus of rodents in the family of Aplodontiidae, found from Spain to Pakistan during the Oligocene.

References 

Extinct rodents